Mobile21 Co., Ltd. (モバイルニジュウイチ株式会社) was a Japanese video game developer that was a 50/50 joint venture between Nintendo and Konami established on October 7, 1999.  Mobile21 primarily concentrated on next-generation Game Boy Advance development, with a particular interest in mobile phone linking features.

History
On 1999-09-02, Nintendo Corporation and Konami Corporation announced the establishment of Mobile21 Co., Ltd., with the Mobile Adapter GB on sale in April 2000. (The Mobile Adapter GB was an accessory for Game Boy Color consoles that allowed them to connect to a cell phone and exchange data such as high scores over the internet.)

The Mobile Adapter GB service began on January 27, 2000, and was terminated on December 14, 2002.

Games 

Game Boy Color
 Pokémon Crystal (2000)
 Net de Get Minigame @100 (2001)
Game Boy Advance
 AirForce Delta Storm (2002)
 Doraemon: Midori no Wakusei Doki Doki Daikyuushuutsu! (2001)
 Gradius Galaxies (2001)
 Jurassic Park III: Island Attack (2001)
 Koro Koro Puzzle Happy Panechu! (2002)
 EX Monopoly (2001)
 Mail de Cute (2002)
Mario Kart Advance (2001)
 Mobile Professional Baseball (2001)
 Monster Guardians (2001)
 Tanbi Musou: Meine Liebe (2001)

References

External links 
 Archived Official website
 Mobile21 history page

Video game companies established in 1999
Defunct video game companies of Japan
Video game development companies
1999 establishments in Japan